Lopúchov is a village and municipality in Bardejov District in the Prešov Region of north-east Slovakia.

History
In historical records the village was first mentioned in 1345.

Geography
The municipality lies at an elevation of 275 metres (900 ft) and covers an area of 8.135 km2 (3.141 mi2).
It has a population of about 315 people.

References

External links
 

Villages and municipalities in Bardejov District
Šariš